Tímea Babos and Kristina Mladenovic defeated Duan Yingying and Zheng Saisai in the final, 6–2, 6–3 to win the women's doubles tennis title at the 2019 French Open.

Barbora Krejčíková and Kateřina Siniaková were the defending champions, but lost in the first round to Nadiia Kichenok and Abigail Spears.

Mladenovic replaced Siniaková as the WTA doubles no. 1 by winning the title. Barbora Strýcová, Elise Mertens, Demi Schuurs, Ashleigh Barty and Zhang Shuai were also in contention for the top ranking.

Seeds

Draw

Finals

Top half

Section 1

Section 2

Bottom half

Section 3

Section 4

References

 Main Draw

Women's Doubles